The 1864 United States presidential election in Kansas took place on November 8, 1864, as part of the 1864 United States presidential election. Kansas voters chose three representatives, or electors, to the Electoral College, who voted for president and vice president.

This was the first presidential election Kansas was involved in, as it had been admitted as the 34th state on January 29, 1861. The state was won by the incumbent President Abraham Lincoln (R-Illinois), running with former Senator and Military Governor of Tennessee Andrew Johnson, with 79.19% of the popular vote, against the 4th Commanding General of the United States Army George B. McClellan (D–New Jersey), running with Representative George H. Pendleton, with 17.78% of the vote.

With 79.19% of the popular vote, Lincoln's victory with in the state would be his strongest victory in the country in terms of percentage in the popular vote, and the strongest performance by any presidential candidate in Kansas history.

543 votes were cast for an independent candidate named E. Cheeseborough along with 112 write-in votes were cast. William G. Cutler's History of the State of Kansas  states that Ellsworth Cheeseborough was nominated for Presidential Elector on the Republican ticket on September 8, 1864, but died before the election. It also appears that the write-in votes were cast for another Republican candidate for Presidential Elector Nelson McCracken, who also died before the election. All of the Cheeseborough votes came from the Soldier's vote.

Results

See also
 United States presidential elections in Kansas

References

Kansas
1864
1864 Kansas elections